Flindersia schottiana, commonly known as bumpy ash, cudgerie or silver ash, is a species of rainforest tree in the family Rutaceae and is native to New Guinea and eastern Australia. It has pinnate leaves with mostly ten to sixteen leaflets, panicles of white flowers and woody fruit studded with rough points.

Description

Taxonomy
Flindersia schottiana was first formally described in 1862 by Ferdinand von Mueller in Fragmenta phytographiae Australiae from specimens collected near the Hastings River in New South Wales. The specific epithet (schottiana) honours Mueller's friend Heinrich Wilhelm Schott.

Distribution and habitat

Conservation status
Flindersia schottiana is classified as of "least concern" under the Queensland Government Nature Conservation Act 1992.

References

schottiana
Sapindales of Australia
Flora of New South Wales
Flora of Queensland
Flora of New Guinea
Taxa named by Ferdinand von Mueller
Plants described in 1862